Charlie Drummond may refer to;

 Charlie Drummond (River City), a character from the BBC soap River City
 Charlie Drummond (Big Brother), a contestant on the 2009 series of the UK version of Big Brother